St. Moritz has been the host to two Winter Olympic Games:

 1928 Winter Olympics
 1948 Winter Olympics